

The Super Rotor AC.4 Andorinha ("Swallow") was a sport autogyro first produced in Brazil in the 1960s. The prototype was built by Altair Coelho and flown in 1960 as the AC.1, a typically minimalist autogyro design consisting of an open framework supporting the pilot's seat, rotor mast, engine mounting and tail fin. Power was supplied by a converted Volkswagen engine driving a pusher propeller. Francisco Mattis purchased the prototype and manufacturing rights and founded Super Rotor (now Montalva) of São Paulo to produce the aircraft. Refinements for serial production as the AC.4 included an extra reinforcing strut for the rotor mast and a larger tail fin. According to Altair Coelho, the AC.4 first flew in 1964, and gained type approval and certification in 1972. 314 were built.

Super Rotor went on to produce a two-seat version with dual controls as the M.1 Montalva, a turbo-charged two-seater as the M.2 Trovão Azul ("Blue Thunder"), and an agricultural version with spray bars as the Agricóptero.

Variants
 AC.1 - single-seat prototype with Volkswagen engine
 AC.4 Andorhina - single-seat production machine with Volkswagen engine. According to Altair Coelho, 314 were built.
 M.1 Montalva - two-seat trainer version of AC.4 with Volkswagen engine
 M.2 Trovão Azul - two-seat high-performance version with turbocharged Santana engine
 Agricóptero - agricultural version

Specifications (AC.4)

Notes

References
 
 
 
 

AC-1
1960s Brazilian sport aircraft
Single-engined pusher autogyros
Aircraft first flown in 1960